The Sea Hawk is a 1940 American adventure film from Warner Bros. that stars Errol Flynn as an English privateer who defends his nation's interests on the eve of the launch of the Spanish Armada. The film was the tenth collaboration between Flynn and director Michael Curtiz. Its screenplay was written by Howard Koch and Seton I. Miller. The rousing musical score by Erich Wolfgang Korngold is recognized as a high point in his career. The film was both an adventure and a period piece about Elizabethan England's struggles with Spain. It was also meant as a deliberately pro-British propaganda film to build morale during World War II and to influence the American public into having a more pro-British outlook. King Philip was presented as an allegorical Hitler.  (The same theme had been visited in Alexander Korda's film Fire Over England, released three years earlier, before World War II started).

Colorized versions of The Sea Hawk were broadcast on American television and distributed on VHS tape in 1986. Only the black-and-white, edited version (109 minutes) and the fully restored/uncut version (127 minutes) have been released on the DVD and Blu-ray formats. No plans have been announced to release the colorized version on DVD.

Plot
King Philip II of Spain declares his intention to destroy England as a first step to world conquest, eager to make his empire reach from Northern Europe to China and India. He sends Don Álvarez as his ambassador to allay the suspicions of Queen Elizabeth I about the great armada he is building to invade England. In England, some of the queen's ministers plead with her to build a fleet, which she hesitates to do in order to spare the purses of her subjects.

The ambassador's ship is captured en route to England by the Albatross and her captain, Geoffrey Thorpe. Don Álvarez and his niece Doña María are taken aboard and transported to England. Thorpe immediately is enchanted by Doña María and gallantly returns her plundered jewels. Her detestation of him softens as she too begins to fall in love.

Don Álvarez is granted an audience with the queen and complains about his treatment; Doña María is accepted as one of her maids of honour. The "Sea Hawks", a group of English privateers who raid Spanish merchant shipping, appear before the queen, who scolds them (at least publicly) for their activities and for endangering the peace with Spain. Captain Thorpe proposes in private a plan to seize a Spanish treasure fleet coming back from Spain's colonies in the Americas. The queen is wary of Spain's reaction, but allows Thorpe to proceed.

Suspicious, Lord Wolfingham, one of the queen's ministers and a secret Spanish collaborator, sends a spy to try to discover where the Albatross is really heading. Upon visiting the chartmaker responsible for drawing the charts for Thorpe's next voyage, Don Álvarez and Lord Wolfingham determine that he is sailing to the Isthmus of Panama and order the captain of Don Álvarez's ship to sail ahead to set up an ambush.

When the Albatross reaches its destination, the ship is spotted. Thorpe's crew seizes the caravan, but fall into a well-laid trap and are driven into the swamps. Thorpe and a few other survivors return to their ship, only to find it in Spanish hands. They are taken to Spain, tried by the Inquisition, and sentenced to life imprisonment as galley slaves. In England, Don Álvarez informs the queen of Thorpe's fate, causing his niece to faint. The queen expels him from her court.

On a Spanish galley, Thorpe meets an Englishman named Abbott who was captured trying to uncover evidence of the Armada's true purpose. The prisoners manage to take over the ship during the night. They board another ship in the harbor, where an emissary has stored secret incriminating plans. Thorpe and his men sail both ships back to England with the plans.

Upon reaching port, Thorpe tries to warn the queen. A carriage bringing Don Álvarez to the ship which, unknown to him, Thorpe has captured, also brings his niece. Don Álvarez boards the ship and is held prisoner, while Captain Thorpe, dressed in the uniform of a Spanish courtier, sneaks into the carriage carrying Doña María, who has decided to stay in England and wait for Thorpe's return. The two finally declare their love for each other, and María helps Thorpe to sneak into the palace. However, Lord Wolfingham's spy spots Thorpe and alerts the castle guards to stop the carriage and take Thorpe prisoner. Thorpe escapes and enters the queen's residence, fending off guards all the while.

Eventually, Thorpe runs into Lord Wolfingham and kills the traitor in a swordfight. With Doña María's assistance, Thorpe reaches the queen and provides proof of King Philip's intentions. Elizabeth knights Thorpe and declares her intention to build a great fleet to oppose the Spanish threat.

Cast

 Errol Flynn as Geoffrey Thorpe
 Brenda Marshall as Doña María
 Claude Rains as Don José Álvarez de Córdoba
 Donald Crisp as Sir John Burleson
 Flora Robson as Queen Elizabeth I of England
 Alan Hale as Carl Pitt
 Henry Daniell as Lord Wolfingham
 Una O'Connor as Miss Latham, Doña María's English duenna
 James Stephenson as Abbott
 Gilbert Roland as Captain López, Don José's sea captain
 William Lundigan as Danny Logan
 Julien Mitchell as Oliver Scott
 Montagu Love as King Philip II of Spain
 J. M. Kerrigan as Eli Matson
 David Bruce as Martin Burke
 Clifford Brooke as William Tuttle
 Clyde Cook as Walter Boggs
 Fritz Leiber Sr. as Inquisitor
 Ellis Irving as Monty Preston
 Francis McDonald as Samuel Kroner
 Pedro de Córdoba as Captain Mendoza
 Ian Keith as Peralta
 Jack La Rue as Lieutenant Ortega (as Jack LaRue)
 Halliwell Hobbes as Astronomer
 Alec Craig as Jodocus Hondius
 Victor Varconi as General Aguirre
 Robert Warwick as Captain Frobisher
 Guy Bellis as Captain Hawkins
 Harry Cording as Slavemaster
 Leyland Hodgson as Officer
 Leo White as Bit Role (uncredited)
 Edgar Buchanan as Ben Rollins (uncredited)

Production
The portions of the film set in the Americas are tinted sepia.

The film was announced in June 1936 and would star Errol Flynn, then coming off his success with Captain Blood.

Originally planned as an adaptation of Rafael Sabatini's 1915 novel The Sea Hawk, the film used an entirely different story inspired by the exploits of Sir Francis Drake, unlike the 1924 silent film adaptation, which was fairly faithful to Sabatini's plot (which, in turn, was very similar to the plot of Captain Blood).

Adaptations of the novel were written by Richard Neville and Delmer Daves before Seton I Miller wrote a basically new story titled Beggars of the Sea based on Sir Francis Drake. Sabatini's name was still used in promotional materials however as it was felt it had commercial value. Howard Koch then reworked Miller's script while still keeping the basic structure and story.

The speech the queen gives at the close of the film was meant to inspire the viewing British audience, which was already in the grip of the Second World War. Suggestions that it was the duty of all free men to defend liberty, and that the world did not belong to any one man (an obvious insinuation of Hitler's wish to conquer Europe), were rousing.

The 2005 Warner Brothers DVD release includes a 1940 Movietone News newsreel of the Battle of Britain, the short "Alice in Movieland," the Looney Tunes cartoon "Porky's Poor Fish", and a 20-minute featurette "The Sea Hawk: Flynn in Action" about the film's production.

Music
The music was written by composer Erich Wolfgang Korngold. When The Sea Hawk opened in theatres, a commercial recording was not contemplated. It was not until 1962 that a bit of music from the film was released on an LP titled Music by Erich Wolfgang Korngold. Ten years later Charles Gerhardt and Korngold's son George included 6:53 minutes of The Sea Hawk score on RCA's album The Classic Film Scores of Erich Wolfgang Korngold.

Reception

Critical
Bosley Crowther wrote in The New York Times of 10 August 1940, 
"Of course, [the film] is all historically cockeyed, and the amazing exploits of Mr. Flynn, accomplished by him in the most casual and expressionless manner, are quite as incredible as the adventures of Dick Tracy. But Flora Robson makes an interesting Queen Elizabeth, Claude Rains and Henry Daniell play a couple of villainous conspirators handsomely, there is a lot of brocaded scenery and rich Elizabethan costumes and, of course, there is Brenda Marshall to shed a bit of romantic light. And, when you come right down to it, that's about all one can expect in an overdressed 'spectacle' film which derives much more from the sword than from the pen."

A review by Time on 19 August 1940 observed that: 
"The Sea Hawk (Warner) is 1940's lustiest assault on the double feature. It cost $1,700,000, exhibits Errol Flynn and 3,000 other cinemactors performing every imaginable feat of spectacular derring-do, and lasts two hours and seven minutes...Produced by Warner's Hal Wallis with a splendor that would set parsimonious Queen Bess's teeth on edge, constructed of the most tried-&-true cinema materials available, The Sea Hawk is a handsome, shipshape picture. To Irish [sic] Cinemactor Errol Flynn, it gives the best swashbuckling role he has had since Captain Blood. For Hungarian Director Michael Curtiz, who took Flynn from bit-player ranks to make Captain Blood and has made nine pictures with him since, it should prove a high point in their profitable relationship."
Filmink called it "pretty close to perfection as these things go."
This movie has a one hundred percent rating based on twelve critic reviews on Rotten Tomatoes.

Box office
The film had been in planning since Errol Flynn's success in the swashbuckler epic Captain Blood. According to Warner Bros records, the film was Warners' most expensive and most popular film of 1940. It made $1,631,000 in the U.S. and $1,047,000 in other markets. Upon release in 1940, the film was among the higher grossing films of the year, and in several states (including Florida, Alabama, Georgia, South Carolina, North Carolina and Virginia) it was the highest grossing film of the year, and in several others (including Tennessee, Mississippi, Kentucky and Arkansas), it was the second highest grossing film of the year, coming behind Rebecca.

1947 re-release
The film was re-released to great popularity in 1947. It was one of the more popular films that screened in France that year.

Awards
The film was nominated for four Academy Awards:
 Art Direction (Black-and-White) (Anton Grot)
 Original Score (Erich Wolfgang Korngold)
 Sound Recording (Nathan Levinson)
 Special Effects (Byron Haskin, Nathan Levinson)

References

External links
 
 
 
 
 DVD Journal review by Mark Bourne

1940 films
1940 adventure films
American adventure films
American black-and-white films
Pirate films
American swashbuckler films
Films about Elizabeth I
Films set in Tudor England
Warner Bros. films
Films directed by Michael Curtiz
Films produced by Hal B. Wallis
Films with screenplays by Howard Koch (screenwriter)
Films scored by Erich Wolfgang Korngold
Films set in the 1580s
Inquisition in fiction
1940s English-language films
1940s American films